Chagani may refer to:
 Chagani, Fars (چاگني = Chāganī)
 Chagani, Hamadan (چگني - Chaganī)